The Odd Fellows Hall, also known as Tadmore Light Lodge,  No. 6184, is a historic Grand United Order of Odd Fellows meeting hall located at Blacksburg, Montgomery County, Virginia.  It was built in 1905, and is a two-story frame structure clad in painted weatherboard siding.  It has a standing seam metal gable roof.  The building served throughout the early- to mid-20th century as the social center of the local African-American community.

It was listed on the National Register of Historic Places in 2005.

References

African-American history of Virginia
Clubhouses on the National Register of Historic Places in Virginia
Buildings and structures completed in 1905
Buildings and structures in Blacksburg, Virginia
Odd Fellows buildings in Virginia
National Register of Historic Places in Montgomery County, Virginia
1905 establishments in Virginia